Morgana Robinson (born 7 May 1982) is an Australian-born English impressionist, comedian, writer and actress, who is best known for her comedy sketch programme The Morgana Show, Morgana Robinson's The Agency, appearances on The TNT Show, House of Fools and Very Important People.

Early life
Robinson was born in Shepparton, Victoria, in Australia. Her family moved to England when she was three. She was educated at Benenden School in Kent.

On her father's side, Robinson has four elder half-siblings, one of whom is Brody Dalle (born Bree Joanna Alice Robinson) of the punk rock band the Distillers and alternative rock band Spinnerette. They first met as adults, backstage at one of Dalle's 2004 concerts at the Brixton Academy.

Television career
Robinson's television debut came in 2007, as she played an Eastern European internet bride in BBC One's comedy The Green Green Grass. She then starred in the TV pilot Eight Steps to Enlightenment and a Nervous Breakdown, an improvised mockumentary, playing Rachel, a self-obsessed glamour model, trying to rid herself of cellulite. In 2009, she appeared as Anna in the BBC One comedy My Family in the episode "It's Training Men".

In 2009, she appeared in a running sketch segment (Gilbert's Special Report) in The TNT Show as Gilbert, a teenage 'special needs' boy who interviews celebrities, alongside his disabled crew members.

In 2010, Channel 4 commissioned a five-part comedy sketch show – The Morgana Show. Channel 4's head of comedy, Shane Allen, said: "Discovering, supporting and nurturing new talent is at the heart of Channel 4 comedy’s remit, and in Morgana we really feel we’ve found a fresh performer with a huge amount of potential." Her stand-out characters being giant-glasses wearing Gilbert ("Grandad!") making TV shows from his bedroom and her impressions of Fern Cotton and mockumentary of Natalie Cassidy "Sonia off Eastenders"

In 2012, Robinson starred in the Channel 4 sketch show Very Important People also starring Terry Mynott. In the show, she impersonates a variety of performers, including Frankie Boyle, Danny Dyer, Amy Childs, and Adele.

In 2014 to 2015, she appeared as sexy nymphomaniac cafe-owner Julie in Vic Reeves and Bob Mortimer's 2-series surreal BBC Two television comedy sitcom House of Fools in which her scene-stealing appearances include an obsessive attraction to Vic's character "Vic Reeves".

In 2016, she appeared as Pippa Middleton in The Windsors, a comedy parody of the British Royal Family in which she uses her sexiness to try to ensnare her sister's brother-in-law Prince Harry.

In 2018, she appeared with Richard Ayoade in Travel Man, visiting Milan.

In 2021, Robinson played Hilary Bowden in series 2, episode 4 of Intelligence. That same year, she participated in the 10 episode, 12th series of Channel 4 comedy game show Taskmaster and won the series.

In March 2022, Robinson appeared as Maxine in Gold comedy Newark, Newark. Also in 2022, Robinson co-starred with Dylan Moran in the BBC Two sitcom Stuck.

Awards
At the 2012 British Comedy Awards, she won in the Best Comedy Breakthrough Artist category.

In 2018, she won the BAFTA Award in the Best Short Form Programme category for Morgana Robinson's Summer.

Filmography

Film

Television

References

External links
 
 The Morgana Show at The British Comedy Guide

1982 births
Living people
English impressionists (entertainers)
English stand-up comedians
English television actresses
English women comedians
People educated at Benenden School
Australian emigrants to England
People from Shepparton
Writers from Victoria (Australia)